Think Twice may refer to:

Music
 "Think Twice" (Brook Benton song), 1961
 "Think Twice" (Jackie Wilson song), a 1966 duet by Jackie Wilson and LaVern Baker
 "Think Twice" (Celine Dion song), 1994
 "Think Twice", a song by Salvation from Love Is the Song We Sing: San Francisco Nuggets 1965–1970
 "Think Twice", a 1974 song by Donald Byrd from Stepping into Tomorrow, covered by many artists
"Think Twice", chorus lyrics from the 1989 Phil Collins' song "Another day in paradise"

Other
 Rethinking, reviewing a decision a second time before acting on it
 Think Twice (game show), U.S. game show
 Think Twice, a novel in Rosato & Associates series
 Think Twice, a play by Ayn Rand collected in The Early Ayn Rand
 "Think Twice", the No campaign in the 1997 Scottish devolution referendum